Janina Mendalska (10 January 1937 – 23 May 1999) was a Polish sprint canoeist who competed in the early 1960s. She finished fourth in the K-2 500 m event at the 1960 Summer Olympics in Rome.

References
Sports-reference.com profile

1937 births
1999 deaths
Canoeists at the 1960 Summer Olympics
Olympic canoeists of Poland
Polish female canoeists
Place of birth missing